Agesarchus was an ancient Greek athlete from Tritaea in Achaea. He was the son of Haemostratus, and won in the men's boxing competitions at all the Panhellenic Games. His victories have been dated around the 165th Olympiad in 120 BC. A statue in his honor was erected at Olympia, the work of the sons of Polycles.

References

Ancient Achaean athletes
Tritaia
Ancient Olympic competitors
3rd-century BC Greek people